Canada Jam was a rock festival concert held at Mosport Park in Bowmanville, Ontario Canada, about 100 kilometres east of Toronto, on August 26, 1978. The festival was produced by Sandy Feldman and Leonard Stogel, who produced California Jam and California Jam II, and was sponsored by Carling O'Keefe. It attracted over 110,000 fans, making it the largest paying rock event in Canadian history at that time. The Molson Canadian Rocks for Toronto a.k.a. "SARSfest" featuring the Rolling Stones and AC/DC eclipsed that mark with an audience of 450,000 people on July 30, 2003.

Canada Jam was the second of three major music festivals held at Mosport between 1970 and 1980.  The other two were the Woodstock-esque Strawberry Fields Festival held August 7–9, 1970 and the punk and new wave themed, Heatwave Festival held August 23, 1980. Both these festivals were produced by Toronto promoter John Brower who facilitated the introduction to Mosport Park for Feldman and Stogel.

Performers 
Canada Jam acts in order of appearance:

Ozark Mountain Daredevils
The Doobie Brothers
Atlanta Rhythm Section
Village People
Dave Mason
Wha-Koo 
Prism
Kansas
Commodores
Triumph
The program ran for 18 hours (3 hours behind schedule) and ended with Triumph's encore at 3:35 AM.

Broadcast, telecast, and record releases 
Four television specials were made from the event and broadcast across the CTV television network in Canada.  Several performances from the show were eventually released on CD and video, both in bootleg and authorized form including performances by Kansas and Triumph.  The event was hosted by CFTR-AM (AM680) in Toronto.

Approximately 350 people were treated in the medical tent for fatigue, cuts and drug and alcohol-related ailments but no major incidents or problems occurred.  Tickets for the event sold for $20.00 in advance and $30.00 on the day of the event and the event grossed an estimated 2.5 million dollars.

See also

List of historic rock festivals
List of jam band music festivals
Lenny Stogel IMDB

References 

1978 music festivals
1978 in Canadian music
Clarington
Rock festivals in Canada
Music festivals in Ontario
Music festivals established in 1978
August 1978 events in Canada